Oki or Ōki may refer to:

Places
Oki District, Shimane, a district in Shimane Prefecture, Japan
Oki Islands, an archipelago in the Sea of Japan
Oki Province, a former province of Japan
Ōki, Fukuoka, a town in southern Japan
Oki Airport, the airport serving the Oki Islands
Oki Jubilee Stadium, a stadium in Kogarah, New South Wales, also known as Jubilee Oval
Orkney, Chapman code OKI

Other uses
Oki (surname), two separate Japanese surnames
Oki (musician), an Ainu musician
Oki (rapper), a Polish rapper
OKI (company), an electronics and printer manufacturer (Oki Data)
Super Oki, the limited express train which runs in San'in Main Line and Yamaguchi Line of West Japan Railway
Oki, the original name of Sheriff Callie on Sheriff Callie's Wild West back when it was going to be called "Oki's Oasis"
Oki, a doll in the Groovy Girls doll line

OKI
Open Knowledge Initiative, an organization that specifies software interfaces for service-oriented architecture (SOA)
Open Knowledge International, a global UK-based non-profit network that promotes and shares information at no charge
Ohio-Kentucky-Indiana Regional Council of Governments
Organisasi Kerja Sama Islam (formerly, Organisasi Konferensi Islam), the Organisation of Islamic Cooperation in Indonesian

See also
Daisen-Oki National Park, in Chūgoku region, Japan
Okay
Okhi Day, a Greek anniversary to commemorate Greek Prime Minister Metaxas's rejection of the ultimatum made by Mussolini 
Okie, a resident of Oklahoma